The 1957 Lehigh Engineers football team was an American football team that represented Lehigh University during the 1957 NCAA College Division football season. Lehigh won the Middle Three Conference championship and the inaugural small-college Lambert Cup.

In their 12th year under head coach William Leckonby, the Engineers compiled an 8–1 record, defeating both of their conference opponents. Dan Nolan and Pete Williams
were the team captains.

In December, the Engineers were the first-ever recipients of the Lambert Cup, an award for the season's best small-college football team in the East. Lehigh was honored alongside Navy, which won the large-college Lambert Trophy; both were lauded as proof that a university could field a competitive football team without compromising its academic standards.

Lehigh played its home games at Taylor Stadium on the university campus in Bethlehem, Pennsylvania.

Schedule

References

Lehigh
Lehigh Mountain Hawks football seasons
Lehigh Engineers football